Japanese football in 2016.

Promotion and relegation
Teams relegated from J1 League
Matsumoto Yamaga
Shimizu S-Pulse
Montedio Yamagata

Teams promoted to J1 League
Omiya Ardija
Júbilo Iwata
Avispa Fukuoka

Teams relegated from J2 League
Oita Trinita
Tochigi SC

Teams promoted to J2 League
FC Machida Zelvia
Renofa Yamaguchi FC

Teams relegated from J3 League
No relegation to the Japan Football League

Teams promoted to J3 League
Kagoshima United

J1 League

J2 League

J3 League

Japan Football League

National team (Men)

Results

Players statistics

National team (Women)

Results

Players statistics

References

External links

 
Seasons in Japanese football